Air One Nine Company was a charter airline based in Tripoli, Libya.

Fleet

Current
The Air One Nine Company fleet included the following aircraft (at 30 May 2010):

2 Douglas DC-9-32 (which are operated by Global Aviation Operations)

Retired
1 Douglas DC-9-32 (operated by Global Aviation Operations)
1 Fokker F28 Mk4000 (operated by Montenegro Airlines)

References

Defunct airlines of Libya
Airlines established in 2004
Economy of Tripoli, Libya